Connecticut's 24th State Senate district elects one member of the Connecticut State Senate. It consists of the communities of Danbury, New Fairfield, Sherman, and parts of Bethel. It has been represented by Democrat Julie Kushner since 2019.

Recent elections

2020

2018

2016

2014

2012

References

24